Galudih railway station is a railway station on Howrah–Nagpur–Mumbai line under Kharagpur railway division of South Eastern Railway zone. It is situated at Galudih- Mahulia in East Singhbhum  district in the Indian state of Jharkhand.

References

Railway stations in East Singhbhum district
Kharagpur railway division